The Minister of Foreign Affairs is a councilor of state and chief of the Norway's Ministry of Foreign Affairs. Since 14 October 2021, the position has been held by Anniken Huitfeldt of the Labour Party.

The Ministry of Foreign Affairs, based at Victoria Terrasse, Oslo, is responsible for Norway's relation with foreign countries, including diplomacy and diplomatic missions, trade, foreign aid and cooperation with international organisations. Except during the four in which a Deputy of the Prime Minister of Norway was appointed, the Minister of Foreign Affairs ranks second in the cabinet after the Prime Minister and is his deputy.

History
The position was created on 7 June 1905, the day Norway declared independence from Sweden, with the Liberal Party's Jørgen Løvland as the inaugural. Forty people from five parties have held the position, all men excepting the current officeholder. From 1983 to 2013 the Minister of International Development, which was responsible for issues related to foreign aid, was attached to the Ministry of Foreign Affairs.

Notable officeholders
Halvard Lange (Labour) is the longest-serving, having held the position for more than eighteen years in four cabinets. The shortest-serving is the fellow party member, Edvard Bull, Sr., who held the position for the sixteen days that Hornsrud's Cabinet lasted. Johan Ludwig Mowinckel (Liberal) was appointed four times as minister. Three people have sat concurrently as Prime Minister and Minister of Foreign Affairs: Løvland, Mowinckel and Ivar Lykke (Conservative). Three officeholders would later become Prime Minister: Løvland, Mowinckel and Kjell Magne Bondevik (Christian Democratic). Two former Prime Ministers have held the office: John Lyng (Conservative) and Thorbjørn Jagland (Labour). Trygve Lie (Labour) resigned from the office to become the inaugural Secretary-General of the United Nations. Two people have died while in office: Knut Frydenlund and Johan Jørgen Holst (both Labour).

List of Ministers
The following lists the Ministers of Foreign Affairs, their party, date of assuming and leaving office, their tenure in years and days, and the cabinet they served in.

Key

Minister of European Affairs
The Minister of European Affairs was responsible for cases related to the EEA and Norway's relation with the EU. The post was established on 16 October 2013 by the Solberg Cabinet, which at the time consisted of the Conservatives and the Progress Party. It was abolished on 17 January 2018 when the Liberals joined the Cabinet.

Key

Ministers

References

External links 
 

Foreign relations of Norway
 
Foreign Affairs
1905 establishments in Norway